The reticulated velvet gecko (Hesperoedura reticulata) is a species of geckos endemic to Australia.

References

Diplodactylidae
Reptiles described in 1969
Geckos of Australia